The Frederick Armory is one of a series of similar armories built for the Maryland National Guard in the early 20th century. The building explicitly copies features of medieval fortifications, with crenelated blocks at either end of a buttressed drill hall.

It was listed on the National Register of Historic Places in 1985.

The armory is now a city recreation center.

References

External links

, including photo in 1980, at Maryland Historical Trust

Armories on the National Register of Historic Places in Maryland
Infrastructure completed in 1913
Buildings and structures in Frederick County, Maryland
1913 establishments in Maryland
National Register of Historic Places in Frederick County, Maryland